Clube de Futebol Estrela da Amadora, sometimes just Estrela, was a Portuguese sports club (predominantly football) based in Amadora, northwest of Lisbon.

Founded in 1932, its football team won the Taça de Portugal in 1990 and played at Estádio José Gomes. After bankruptcy in 2011, it reformed in 2020 as Club Football Estrela da Amadora, a brand-new club that didn't take the honours and the exact name of the original one.

History 
While never a contender to the place of the third-most important club in the Lisbon Football Association, Estrela da Amadora won a Cup of Portugal in 1990 and one second division championship in 1992–93. In 16 seasons in top flight football – eight consecutive – its best season was in 1997–98, when the team finished in seventh position, under the guidance of Fernando Santos.

After winning the cup in 1990, Estrela reached the second round in the UEFA Cup Winners' Cup. In the following decades, the team maintained its first division status in most seasons. In 2008–09, however, amidst serious financial difficulties, it was (twice) relegated even though it finished the campaign in mid-table.

Coach António Veloso only managed to lead Amadora to the tenth position in the third level in the 2009–10 season. Subsequently, as the club's dreadful economic situation persisted – which led to a two-year suspension from all activity by the Portuguese Football Federation – it folded.

In 2011 the club was declared insolvent by a court and closed its doors. Some supporters created a new club, Clube Desportivo Estrela in the following year to keep with youth teams and other sports, and continue with the history and legacy of Estrela da Amadora. In October 2018, CD Estrela created a senior football team.

In 2020, the club's members voted 92% in favour in July 2020 of a merger with Club Sintra Football, taking that team's place in the third-tier Campeonato de Portugal. It was not possible to revert to Estrela's original name to form a Sociedade Anónima Desportiva. The club's first season ended with promotion, despite losing the play-off final 1–0 to C.D. Trofense.

The new club didn't take the honours of any of its predecessors (Clube de Futebol Estrela da Amadora, Clube Desportivo Estrela and Club Sintra Football), so Clube de Futebol Estrela da Amadora is effectively extinct.

League and Cup history

Europe

Honours 

 Taça de Portugal: 1989–90
 Segunda Liga: 1992–93

Kit 
Estrela's kit was white with the shirt split with three colours (hence the nickname 'the tricolours'). Left side was red, the middle white and the right green, with the shorts and socks white. The club was longtime sponsored by national brands Tepa and Cofidis.

In 2005, Estrela decided to change the club's kit to traditional white, copying the badge and taking away the old red, green and white striped kit.

Notable players 
Throughout its history, Estrela da Amadora has formed and had some notable players in Portugal, and some of them internationally. Some examples are Paulo Bento (former Portuguese player and currently head coach of South Korea's national team) and Jorge Andrade (former Portuguese player who played for clubs as F.C. Porto, Deportivo de La Coruña and Juventus).

 Abel Xavier
 Bebé
 Dimas
 Jorge Andrade
 Miguel
 Paulo Bento
 Paulo Fonseca

References 

 
Football clubs in Portugal
Association football clubs established in 1932
1932 establishments in Portugal
Taça de Portugal winners
Association football clubs disestablished in 2011
2011 disestablishments in Portugal